Royal York may refer to:

Hotels
 The Principal York, York, England formerly known as The Royal York Hotel
 Fairmont Royal York, Toronto, Ontario, Canada

Transport
 Royal York Road, Toronto, Ontario, Canada
 Royal York (TTC) subway station, Toronto, Ontario, Canada
 Royal York, an international night train of the Canadian Pacific Railway and New York Central